Soy Luna is the first album in a series of soundtracks. It was released on February 26, 2016.

The CD includes songs from the first season of the novel, the opening, "Alas", interpreted by the protagonist Karol Sevilla, in addition to other hits, "Valiente", "Prófugos", "Corazón", among others.

In Italy and Germany the CD was released with bonus tracks with songs in other languages.

Track listing

Charts

Weekly charts

Year-end charts

Certifications

References 

Soy Luna albums
2016 soundtrack albums
Latin pop soundtracks